Franklin Orlando Corozo Quiñónez (born February 15, 1981) is an Ecuadorian footballer currently playing for Deportivo Azogues.

Club career

Emelec
He wore the Emelec jersey a few times in his career and this time did not score out of many chances. He only had 9 appearances for Emelec but was an important time for his career. He was transferred to Barcelona in 2006.

Barcelona
During Corozo's stint with Ecuador's most popular club he was not paid attention to and so he had only one appearance. Although that one appearance with the canaries was thought as a good start, he was sold out to arch rivals Emelec yet again.

Azogues
After Franklin joined Azogues, he had an important role for them. For the first time of his career Franklin was a starter and was used quite often. With only 42 appearances and good defending he attracted many and was a key player for Azogues. Due to  this Franklin soon joined Deportivo Quito on January 1, 2008.

Deportivo Quito
He is an important key player for Deportivo Quito. He instantly became a starter and played many important games. He helped his team qualify for the Copa Sudamericana 2008 by coming in first place in Ecuador's Serie A first phase. During the Sudamericana, he helped his team eliminate Universitario of Peru due to solid defending. As they got up their next rival was San Luis of Mexico. Although his team played an excellent game in Mexico, they lost in the aggregate 4-5. He succeeded in winning the Ecuadorian league of 2008.

International career
Corozo played at the 2001 FIFA World Youth Championship in Argentina, along with notable countrymen Franklin Salas, Segundo Castillo, and Felix Borja. He was called up in December 2008 to play in a quadrangular friendly tournament in Oman.

References

External links
 

1981 births
Living people
Sportspeople from Esmeraldas, Ecuador
Association football defenders
Ecuadorian footballers
C.S. Emelec footballers
Barcelona S.C. footballers
Deportivo Azogues footballers
S.D. Quito footballers
C.S.D. Macará footballers
C.S.D. Independiente del Valle footballers
Mushuc Runa S.C. footballers
S.D. Aucas footballers
Ecuador international footballers